The Strong Man's Burden is a 1913 American drama film featuring Harry Carey. It was produced by the Biograph Company and distributed through the General Film Company.

Cast
 Kate Bruce as Bob & John's Mother
 Harry Carey as Bob
 Lionel Barrymore as John
 William J. Butler as The Doctor
 Claire McDowell as The Nurse

See also
 Harry Carey filmography
 Lionel Barrymore filmography

References

External links

1913 films
1913 drama films
1913 short films
Silent American drama films
American silent short films
American black-and-white films
Films directed by Anthony O'Sullivan
1910s American films